Josaphata Hordashevska, born Michaelina Hordashevska (20 November 1869 – 7 April 1919) an ethnic Ukrainian Greek-Catholic in the Austro-Hungarian Empire Religious Sister, was the first member and co-foundress of the Sisters Servants of Mary Immaculate.

Biography 
Michaelina Hordashevska was born 20 November 1869 in Lviv, then part of the Austro-Hungarian Empire and now Ukraine, into a family who were members of the Ukrainian Catholic Church. At the age of 18, she considered consecrating her life to God in a contemplative monastery of the Basilian nuns, then the only Eastern-rite women's religious congregation. She attended a spiritual retreat which was preached by a Basilian monk, Jeremiah Lomnytskyj, whose spiritual guidance she sought. With his permission, Hordashevska took a private vow of chastity for one year. She was to renew this vow twice.

At that time, Lomnytsky, seeing that there was a need of active religious sisters to meet the social needs of the poor and needy faithful of the church, had decided to establish a women's congregation which would follow an active life of service. He did so in conjunction with Cyril Sielecki, pastor of the village of Zhuzhelyany. Lomnytsky felt that Hordashevska would be an appropriate candidate to found such a congregation. Thus she was asked to be the foundress of such a group, rather than follow the monastic life she had been considering. When she agreed, she was sent in June 1892 to the Polish Roman Catholic Felician Sisters to experience the life of community which followed an active consecrated life.

Hordashevska returned to Lviv two months later and, on 24 August 1892, took the religious habit of the new congregation and received the name Josaphata, in honor of the Ukrainian Catholic martyr, Josaphat Kuntsevych. She then went to Zhuzhelyany, and became the first Superior of the seven young women who had been recruited for the new institute, training them in the spirit and charism of the Sisters Servants: "Serve your people where the need is greatest".

For the rest of her life, Hordashevska led the new congregation, through its growth and development. She oversaw the development of the various new ministries the Sisters entered. For this, she had to steer a new path for the sisters in the Eastern Church, sometimes being caught between the conflicting visions of Lomnytsky and Sielecki.

By 1902 the congregation numbered 128 sisters, in 26 convents across the country. They were able to hold their first General Chapter in August of that year, at which Hordashevska was elected the first superior general of the congregation and Lomnytsky resigned from that office. Soon, however, internal divisions led Hordashevska to tender her resignation to the Metropolitan Archbishop of Lviv, Andrey Sheptytsky. Under the new superior general appointed by the Metropolitan Archbishop, Hordashevska and her natural sister, Arsenia Hordashevska, were denied permission to take permanent vows.

Due to her canonical status of still being in temporary vows, Hordashevska was ineligible to participate in the next General Chapter of the congregation. Nonetheless, she was elected vicaress general of the congregation in absentia, with the delegates of the chapter petitioning the metropolitan that she be allowed to make her permanent vows. This request was granted, and Hordashevska did so the following day, 11 May 1909, and assumed the office to which she had been voted.

Three years later, Hordashevska was diagnosed with tuberculosis of the bone. In 1919, at the age of 49 and on the day she had predicted, she died amidst terrible suffering. Her mortal remains were exhumed in 1982 and taken to Rome, where they are kept in a reliquary in the general motherhouse of the Sisters Servants in Rome. The process of her beatification started in Rome in 1983 and on 27 June 2001 she was beatified by Pope John Paul II in Lviv. Numerous miracles are ascribed due to her intercession after her death.

As of 2001, her religious order, the Sisters Servants of Mary Immaculate is now the largest female religious community in the Ukrainian Greek Catholic Church.

Influence 
According to the testimony of Philomena Yuskiv, "She [Josaphata Hordashevska] showed her love for her people through her heart-felt desire to lift them up morally and spiritually; she taught children, youth and women, served the sick, visited the poor and needy, taught liturgical chant and looked after the Church's beauty."

Relics 
In November 1982, Hordashevska's remains were transferred to a small chapel in the general chapter of the Congregation of the Sisters Servants of Mary Immaculate in Rome. Small parts of the relics remain in various places around Ukraine. This includes a monastery in the city of Lviv, located on Pasichna Street.

Beatification 
On 27 June 2001, she was proclaimed Blessed by Pope John Paul II in Lviv. The beatification ceremony took place on 27 June 2001 in Lviv during the Holy Liturgy in the Byzantine rite with the participation of Pope John Paul II.

See also

Byzantine Discalced Carmelites

References

External links
 SSMI Website, Canadian Province: Causes: Blessed Josaphata
 Patron Saints Index: Bl. Josaphata Michaelina Hordashevska

1869 births
1919 deaths
Eastern Catholic beatified people
People from Lviv
People from the Kingdom of Galicia and Lodomeria
Ukrainian Austro-Hungarians
Members of the Ukrainian Greek Catholic Church
20th-century deaths from tuberculosis
Founders of Eastern Catholic religious communities
20th-century Eastern Catholic nuns
20th-century venerated Christians
Beatifications by Pope John Paul II
Venerated Catholics by Pope John Paul II
Tuberculosis deaths in Ukraine
Austro-Hungarian nuns
19th-century Eastern Catholic nuns